Anton Burko (born 16 February 1995) is a Belarusian former professional footballer.

References

External links

 
Profile at Pressball

1995 births
Living people
Belarusian footballers
FC Belshina Bobruisk players
Association football midfielders